This article contains information about the literary events and publications of 1847.

Events
January – Vanity Fair: Pen and Pencil Sketches of English Society begins serial publication in Punch magazine (London) in yellow covers, with illustrations by the author, William Makepeace Thackeray, writing for the first time in his own name.
March–April – Ivan Goncharov's debut novel A Common Story («Обыкновенная история», Obyknovennaya istorya) is published in Sovremennik (Saint Petersburg).
March 20 – The String of Pearls, probably written by James Malcolm Rymer and Thomas Peckett Prest, concludes its serial publication in the 'penny dreadful' The People's Periodical issued by Edward Lloyd in London, begun in November 1846. This is the first literary appearance of Sweeney Todd.
April – Robert Browning settles with his wife and fellow poet Elizabeth Barrett Browning in Florence.

June
Elizabeth Gaskell's first published work of fiction, the story "Life in Manchester: Libbie Marsh's Three Eras", appears in Howitt's Journal of Literature and Popular Progress under the pen name Cotton Mather Mills.
Hans Christian Andersen begins his first visit to Britain, during which he meets Charles Dickens.
June 10 – The fictional date at the end of Anne Brontë's The Tenant of Wildfell Hall is presumed to be that of the novel's completion.
July – The London publisher Thomas Cautley Newby accepts for publication Emily Brontë's Wuthering Heights and Anne Brontë's Agnes Grey.
August 7–24 – Charlotte Brontë completes Jane Eyre at Haworth and sends the manuscript to her publisher, who has rejected The Professor.
September – Varney the Vampire; or, the Feast of Blood, probably written by James Malcolm Rymer and Thomas Preskett Prest, having been published serially since 1845 as a 'penny dreadful' by Edward Lloyd in London, is first issued in book format. It introduces many of the tropes of vampire fiction.
September 16 – William Shakespeare's house of birth in Stratford-upon-Avon in England is bought by the United Shakespeare Company for preservation. This year also, Schiller's house in Weimar is opened to the public as a museum.
October 19 – Charlotte Brontë's Jane Eyre is published (as "an autobiography, edited by Currer Bell") in London by Smith, Elder & Co. in 3 volumes.
November – Dmitry Grigorovich's anti-serfdom novel Anton Goremyka («Антон-горемыка», "Luckless Anton") is published in Sovremennik with its politically sensitive last scene rewritten by a censor.
November 1 – John Maddison Morton's one-act farce Box and Cox (adapted from the French) opens at the Lyceum Theatre, London (under the new management of Madame Vestris and her husband Charles James Mathews) with John Pritt Harley and John Baldwin Buckstone in the title roles.
December 14 – Emily Brontë's Wuthering Heights and Anne Brontë's Agnes Grey are published in a three-volume set under the pen names of Ellis and Acton Bell respectively, in London by T. C. Newby. Wuthering Heights will be Emily's only published novel, as she dies a year later, aged 30.
unknown date – The London publisher E. Churton brings out the first six of George Sand's books to be issued in English, as translated by Matilda Hays, Eliza Ashurst and Rev. Edmund Larken.

New books

Fiction
Honoré de Balzac – Le Cousin Pons
Anne Brontë (as Acton Bell) – Agnes Grey
Charlotte Brontë (as Currer Bell) – Jane Eyre
Emily Brontë (as Ellis Bell) – Wuthering Heights
Benjamin Disraeli – Tancred
Alexandre Dumas – The Vicomte of Bragelonne: Ten Years Later (Le Vicomte de Bragelonne, ou Dix ans plus tard; serialization begins; in English usually in three parts, The Vicomte of Bragelonne, Louise de la Vallière, The Man in the Iron Mask)
Ivan Goncharov – A Common Story
Catherine Gore – Castles in The Air
Dmitry Grigorovich – Anton Goremyka
James Sheridan Knowles – George Lovell
Eliza Lynn Linton – Azeth, The Egyptian
Herman Melville – Omoo
G. W. M. Reynolds – Faust: A Romance of the Secret Tribunals
George Sand – Le Péché de M. Antoine (The Sin of M. Antoine)
Harriet Anne Scott – The Hen-Pecked Husband
The Sobieski Stuarts – Tales of the Century: or Sketches of the romance of history between the years 1746 and 1846
Eugène Sue
Martin l'enfant trouvé ou Mémoires d'un valet de chambre (Martin the Foundling, publication completed)
Les Sept pêchés capitaux (The Seven Deadly Sins,  publication begins)
William Makepeace Thackeray – Vanity Fair (serialisation)
Charlotte Elizabeth Tonna – The System
Anthony Trollope – The Macdermots of Ballycloran

Children and young people
Frederick Marryat – The Children of the New Forest

Drama
John Baldwin Buckstone
The Flowers of the Forest
The Green Bushes
Gustav Freytag – Graf Waldemar
 Richard Brinsley Peake – 
 Gabrielli
 The Title Deeds

Poetry
Heinrich Heine – Atta Troll
Henry Wadsworth Longfellow – Evangeline
Petar II Petrović-Njegoš, Prince-Bishop of Montenegro – The Mountain Wreath (Горски вијенац, Gorski vijenac), Serbian epic verse drama
Edgar Allan Poe – Ulalume
Raja Ali Haji or his sister Saleha – Syair Abdul Muluk
Christina Rossetti – Verses by Christina G. Rossetti
Alfred Tennyson – The Princess

Non-fiction
Hans Christian Andersen – The Fairy Tale of My Life (Das Märchen meines Lebens ohne Dichtung, autobiography)
William Wells Brown – Narrative of William W. Brown, a Fugitive Slave, Written by Himself
Andrew Jackson Davis – The Principles of Nature
Søren Kierkegaard – Works of Love (Kjerlighedens Gjerninger)
Karl Marx – The Poverty of Philosophy (Misère de la philosophie)
William H. Prescott – A History of the Conquest of Peru

Births
January 6 – Milovan Glišić, Serbian dramatist and translator (died 1908)
January 9 – Oyyarathu Chandu Menon, Indian Malayalam-language novelist (died 1899)
January 27 – Ella Dietz, American actress and author (died 1920)
April 2 – Flora Annie Steel (Flora Annie Webster), English writer (died 1929)
April 7 – Jens Peter Jacobsen, Danish novelist (died 1885)
April 10 – Joseph Pulitzer, Hungarian American newspaperman (died 1911)
April 10 – Clarissa Caldwell Lathrop, American social reformer and autobiographer (died 1892)
June 16 – Luella Dowd Smith, American educator and author (died 1941)
August 20 – Bolesław Prus (Aleksander Głowacki), Polish novelist (died 1912)
September 2 – George Robert Sims, English writer (died 1922)
September 22 – Alice Meynell (Alice Thompson), English poet (died 1922)
October 1 – Annie Besant, English women's rights activist, writer and orator (died 1933)
October 3 – Lilian Whiting, American journalist, editor, and author (died 1942)
October 18 – E. E. Brown, American author and artist (year of death unknown)
October 19 – Aurilla Furber, American author, editor, and activist (died 1898)
November 8 – Bram Stoker, Irish novelist and theater manager (died 1912)
December 17 – Émile Faguet, French writer and critic (died 1916)
December 26 – Hugh Conway, English novelist (died 1885)
unknown date:
Eunice Gibbs Allyn, American correspondent, author, songwriter (died 1916)
Maria Fetherstonhaugh, English novelist (died 1918)

Deaths
February 8 – George Walker, English Gothic novelist (born 1772)
April 23 – Erik Gustaf Geijer, Swedish historian, poet, philosopher, and composer  (born 1783) 
May 4 – Alexandre Vinet, Swiss critic and theologian (born 1797)
August 14 – Frans Michael Franzén, Swedish writer (born 1772) 
August 28 – Eugène Bourgeois, French dramatist (born 1818)
September 16 – Grace Aguilar, English novelist (born 1816)
October 13 – Johann Heinrich van Ess, German theologian (born 1772)
October 22 – Henriette Herz, German salon hostess (born 1764)
December 14 – Dorothy Ann Thrupp, hymnwriter and translator (born 1779)

References

 
Years of the 19th century in literature